Mystery Castle is located in the city of Phoenix, Arizona, in the foothills of South Mountain Park. It was built in the 1930s by Boyce Luther Gulley for his daughter Mary Lou Gulley.  After learning he had tuberculosis, Gulley moved from Seattle to the Phoenix area and began building the house from found or inexpensive materials.  Boyce Gulley died in 1945, and Mary Lou and her mother were notified by attorney that they had inherited the property. Shortly after, the mother and daughter moved in.

Their story attracted attention, giving the home some renown as well as its exotic name:  A Life Magazine story (January 26, 1948)  used the headline  "Life Visits a Mystery Castle: A Young Girl Rules Over the Strange Secrets of a Fairy Tale Dream House in the Arizona Desert." The photograph featured Mary Lou posing atop the cantilever staircase leading to the roof of the house.  That same year, Mary Lou and her mother began offering tours of the home.

Construction
Said to be held together by a combination of mortar, cement, calcium, and goat milk, the sprawling 18-room, three story castle is built from a wide range of materials – stone, adobe, automobile parts, salvaged rail tracks from a mine, telephone poles, etc. It features a chapel, cantina, and a dungeon. Parts of the castle remain unfinished, and electricity and plumbing weren't added until 1992.  As the housing boom progressed in Phoenix, new development encroached close to the castle and its grounds, making it far less isolated.

Mary Lou Gulley died on November 3, 2010. The property is now maintained by the Mystery Castle Foundation, a 501c3 non-profit organization.

The Mystery Castle has been designated as a Phoenix Point of Pride.

Extensively vandalized on March 6, 2022, the Mystery Castle suffered an estimated $100,000 in damage.  No arrests have been made.  The Castle was closed for tours, but reopened on March 18, 2022.

Gallery

See also

 List of historic properties in Phoenix, Arizona
 Phoenix Historic Property Register
 Tovrea Castle
 El Cid Castle

References

External links
 Mystery Castle – official site
 Article and photos with contact information about the Mystery Castle
 Article and photos
 Photos taken on Jan. 8, 2011
  – 

Landmarks in Arizona
Museums in Phoenix, Arizona
Phoenix Points of Pride
Houses in Phoenix, Arizona
Castles in the United States
Historic house museums in Arizona
1930s establishments in Arizona
Visionary environments